Powney is a surname. Notable people with the surname include:

 Brian Powney (born 1944), English footballer 
 Cassie Powney (born 1983), English actress
 Christopher Powney, artistic director and CEO of the Royal Ballet School
 Connie Powney (born 1983), English actress, twin sister of Cassie
 Peniston Powney (1690s–1757), British landowner and politician